Banashree Sengupta (6 May 1945 – 19 February 2017) was a singer from India.  She lent her voice to numerous Bengali, Hindi, Assamese, Bhojpuri, and Odia songs during her long career.

Early years
Banashree's father Shri Shailendranath Roy was a noted Indian classical singer of Hugli-Chuchura, West Bengal. She was born to a family of Ayurveda doctors and their house in Chinsurah was known as Kabiraj Bari (doctors' house /). However, her grandfather and father were proficient artists in Indian Classical Music. Her father introduced her to Indian Classical music at an early age. She passed School Final Examination from Banimandir Balika Vidyalaya.

Learning Music
Apart from her father, Banashree received training in singing from various masters. Shri Rajen Bandyopadhyay imparted training in Indian classical music while she was at Chinsurah. After her marriage to Sri Shanti Sengupta in 1965, she moved to Kolkata. Here, she received training from several exponents of music in various branches, such as Khayal from Ustad Sagiruddin Khan, Pandit Usharanjan Mukhopadhyay and Pandit Shailen Bandyopadhyay, a folk song from Dinendra Choudhury, Geet and Bhajan from Kamal Ganguly, Najrul Geeti from Ramanuj Dasgupta and adhunik song from Rabindra Jain, Prabir Majumder, Neeta Sen, and Sudhin Dasgupta.

Career
Banashree Sengupta started singing in Akashvani in 1964, where she rendered Geet, Bhajan, Adhunik, Rabindra Sangeet, Nazrul Geeti, and songs for children. Her first album was released from HMV (SAREGAMA HMV) in 1966.

She will be remembered for her outstanding performances in Tapan Sinha's movie Harmonium, Yatrik's Chhinnapatra etc.
She also sang in the 1976 Mahalaya program, Devim Durgatiharinim, where she rendered her voice in a duet with Manabendra Mukhopadhyay. The song was "Shudha Tarangini he leela rangini". However the song wasn't played in the radio program.

Awards
Banashree received many awards. The government of West Bengal conferred the Sangeet Sanman award in 2012 and Maha Sangeet Sanman in 2013. Apart from that she received Uttam Kumar Award, Dishari Award, Bengali Film Journalists Association award, Pramathesh Barua award, Michael Madhusudan award,  etc.

Literary works
Though literature was not her domain, she contributed an article that is a pleasant read, published in a newspaper on 23 July 2016, describing the locality where she lived in Argya Abasan of Pratapaditya Road, Kolkata.

Travel
Banashree Sengupta traveled to many countries to present her songs. She visited USSR as a part of the Government delegation in 1986. She attended North America Bango Sammiloni in Toronto in 1998 and Basanta Utsab in Toronto in 2011. She performed in Milton Keynes, Luton, London, and Glasgow in England, New York, New Jersey, Cherry Field, Long Island, Heart Ford, Boston, Tarrency City, Clave Land, and Florida in the USA, and Montreal and Toronto in Canada.

Death
On 19 February Banashree Sengupta breathed her last at 11.30 am at SSKM hospital after being admitted for ten days. “Deeply saddened at the passing of legendary singer Banashree Sengupta. My condolences to her family and fans” tweeted Mamata Bandyopadhyay, Chief Minister of West Bengal, expressing grief. Many eminent personalities, singers, artists, and common citizen expressed their sorrow at the demise of Sengupta. A large number of her admirers placed wreaths on the body that was kept for public viewing at Rabindra Sadan before the cremation at Keoratolla burning ghat.

See also 

 List of Indian playback singers

References

External links 

 Banashree Sengupta on IMDb

1946 births
2017 deaths
Bengali people
Bengali singers
Bengali playback singers
Singers from West Bengal
Indian women playback singers
20th-century Indian singers
20th-century Indian women singers
Women musicians from West Bengal